Frida Gustafsson Spång (born 15 February 1993) is a Swedish professional golfer who has played on the Ladies European Tour (LET). She was runner-up at the 2021 Aramco Team Series team event in London.

Amateur career
Spång's early achievements include winning the 2010 Grand Prix des Landes in Biarritz and the 2011 Swedish Girls Championship. She played for the National Team and represented Sweden at the European Girls' Team Championship and the European Ladies' Team Championship, winning silver in 2014 and bronze in 2016. 

She also played in The Spirit International Amateur Golf Championship in Trinity, Texas in 2013 with Linnea Johansson, as well as the 2016 Espirito Santo Trophy in Mexico, together with Emma Henrikson and Linnea Ström.

College career
Spång attended East Carolina University from 2012 to 2016. As a freshman, she became the first golfer in Conference USA women's history to be named both the Player and Freshman of the Year in the same season. As a senior, she was named Second-Team All-America by the Women's Golf Coaches Association (WGCA). She set a new single-season record with four tournament wins (UCF Challenge, 3M Augusta Invitational, Briar’s Creek Invitational and the American Championships) and became the all-time leader in wins with seven college career wins. She posted an ECU-best 72.25 seasonal stroke average and was named 2016 American Athletic Conference Women's Golf Player of the Year.

Professional career
Spång turned professional and joined the LET in 2017 after finishing 21st at the Lalla Aicha Q-School. Her best finish in her rookie season was a tie for 7th at the Ladies European Thailand Championship.

Spång was runner-up at the 2017 Swedish PGA Championship, an LET Access Series event, one stroke behind Valentine Derrey. In 2017 she was also runner-up at the Ulricehamn Ladies Open and the Ladies Norwegian Open, both Swedish Golf Tour events. In 2018, she lost a playoff to My Leander at the Nes Open on the same tour, but won a playoff against Lina Boqvist at the Hjo S Open for her maiden professional victory.

On the 2021 Ladies European Tour, she was runner-up at the Aramco Team Series in London teamed with Marianne Skarpnord and Carmen Alonso, three strokes behind the winning team captained by Olivia Cowan.

Amateur wins
2008 (2) Patrik Sjöland Junior Open, Skandia Tour Riks #5 - Halland
2009 (2) Wendels Junior Open, Johan Edfors Junior Open
2010 (2) Chalmers Junior Open, Grand Prix des Landes
2011 (1) Swedish Girls Championship
2012 (2) UNCG Starmount Fall Classic, Wilson Junior Masters Invitational Open
2013 (1) JMU Eagle Landing Invitational
2014 (1) Minnesota Invitational
2016 (4) UCF Challenge, 3M Augusta Invitational, Briar's Creek Invitational, The American Championship

Sources:

Professional wins (1)

2018 Hjo S Open
Source:

Team appearances
Amateur
European Girls' Team Championship (representing Sweden): 2011
European Ladies' Team Championship (representing Sweden): 2013, 2014, 2016
The Spirit International Amateur Golf Championship (representing Sweden): 2013
Espirito Santo Trophy (representing Sweden): 2016

References

External links

Swedish female golfers
East Carolina Pirates women's golfers
Ladies European Tour golfers
Sportspeople from Gothenburg
People from Mark Municipality
1993 births
Living people